WBMH (106.1 FM) is an American radio station licensed to serve the community of Grove Hill, Alabama. The station is owned by Thomas Butts, through licensee Pine City Radio, LLC.

Programming
Until mid-November 2017, WBMH broadcast a classic country music format and uses programming from Citadel Media and Jones Radio Network, as well as NASCAR programming from MRN Radio and the Performance Racing Network.

In addition to its usual music programming, WBMH and sister station WHOD broadcast the football and baseball games of Jackson High School, Leroy High School, Washington County High School, Jackson Academy and Clarke Preparatory School. WBMH is an affiliate station for University of South Alabama football broadcasts.

History
The station was assigned the WBMH call letters by the Federal Communications Commission on March 4, 2002.

In mid-November 2017, WBMH went silent (off the air).  (info taken from Alabama Broadcast Media Page)

In February 2018, WBMH returned to the air with classic country, branded as "Bama 106".

References

External links

BMH
Radio stations established in 2000
Mass media in Clarke County, Alabama
2000 establishments in Alabama